Glencoe Mountain (previously known as The White Corries Ski Centre) is an alpine ski area set about Mheall a' Bhuiridh in some of the most dramatic mountain scenery in Scotland. The ski area is located adjacent to the A82 road, near to the village of Glencoe, Highland, approximately 16 miles south of Fort William and 92 miles north of Glasgow.

Glencoe is the oldest alpine ski area in Scotland, the first ski tow being installed in 1955 at a cost of about £5,000.
The ski area currently has eight lifts  serving some of Scotland’s longest and steepest pistes. The Coire Pollach non-detachable Poma surface / drag lift was added to the mountain for the start of the 2016 season. The current access chairlift was renovated around this time, with new chairs and engine drive, as were the cafe facilities at the base of the mountain, accompanied by a new ticketing system and a new rental building. Installation of the new Rannoch 3 person chairlift is complete, and is due to operate for the 2022/23 winter.

During the winter, snowsports, lessons, sledging and lift accessed hiking is available. The chairlift runs throughout the year, providing access to the mountain in summer for tourists, climbers, hikers and mountain bikers. A range of cross country and downhill mountain bike trails and bike, helmet and armour rental are available as are sno-tubing sessions on the plastic slope at the base of the mountain.

Onsite accommodation is available year-round in micro-lodges, electric hookups and camping plots. Accommodation is also available in nearby Glencoe, Ballachulish, Killin, crianlarich and Fort William.
 
The main resort building suffered a fire on Christmas Day 2019, which necessitated the demolition of the main cafe, ticket office and rental department. Temporary replacement structures were erected, including the 'White Corries Cafe' at the bottom of the car park. The new cafe opened in March 2022, and most temporary buildings were removed at that time. The ticket office remains in a temporary building until further notice.

Citylink buses provide public transport to the ski area, stopping on the A82 main road.

References

External links
Glencoe Mountain Resort
Snow report on Winterhighland

Ski areas and resorts in Scotland
Glen Coe